Download Series Volume 10 is a live album by the rock band the Grateful Dead. It was released as a three-disc digital download on February 7, 2006.  It contains almost all of the concert the band performed on July 21, 1972 at the Paramount Northwest Theatre in Seattle, Washington.

The album is missing the opener, Chuck's Berry's "Promised Land". At the end of "Casey Jones" is a truncated and error-filled version of "Weather Report Suite: Prelude." When it is over, Bob Weir chuckles and says, "Well anyway, what we're going to do next is history." The third disc is supplemented by two songs from the first set and three from the second set from a show the following night at the same location.  Volume 10 was mastered in HDCD format by Jeffrey Norman.

Track listing
Disc one
First set:
 "Sugaree" (Garcia, Hunter) - 7:57
 "Black-Throated Wind" (Weir, Barlow) - 6:57
 "Cumberland Blues" (Garcia, Lesh, Hunter) - 5:41
 "Me and Bobby McGee" (Kristofferson, Foster) - 5:44
 "Loser" (Garcia, Hunter) - 6:50
 "Mexicali Blues" (Weir, Barlow) - 3:36
 "China Cat Sunflower" > (Garcia, Hunter) - 5:01
 "I Know You Rider" (Trad. Arr. By Grateful Dead) - 6:56
 "Beat It On Down the Line" (Fuller) - 3:28
 "Stella Blue" (Garcia, Hunter) - 7:43
 "Playing In The Band" (Weir, Hart, Hunter) - 11:32
 "Tennessee Jed" (Garcia, Hunter) - 8:09
Disc two
Second set:
 "Casey Jones" (Garcia, Hunter) - 8:09
 "Me and My Uncle" (Phillips) - 3:15
 "Deal" (Garcia, Hunter) - 5:27
 "Jack Straw" (Weir, Hunter) - 5:15
 "He's Gone" > (Garcia, Hunter) - 9:16
 "Truckin' " > (Garcia, Lesh, Weir, Hunter) - 10:31
 "Drums" > (Kreutzmann) - 5:44
 "The Other One" > (Weir, Kreutzmann) - 22:23
 "Comes A Time" (Garcia, Hunter) - 7:28
Disc three
 "Sugar Magnolia" (Weir, Hunter) - 6:58
 "Ramble On Rose" (Garcia, Hunter) - 6:26
 "Goin' Down The Road Feeling Bad" > (Trad. Arr. By Grateful Dead) - 5:21
 "Not Fade Away" (Hardin, Petty) - 3:19
July 22, 1972 bonus tracks:
 "You Win Again" (Williams) - 4:06
 "Bird Song" (Garcia, Hunter) - 9:35
 "Playing In The Band" (Weir, Hart, Hunter) - 13:47
 "Morning Dew" (Dobson, Rose) - 12:04
 "Uncle John's Band" (Garcia, Hunter) - 7:36
 "One More Saturday Night" (Weir) - 5:02

Personnel
Grateful Dead
 Jerry Garcia – lead guitar, vocals
 Donna Jean Godchaux – vocals
 Keith Godchaux – piano 
 Bill Kreutzmann – drums 
 Phil Lesh – electric bass
 Bob Weir – rhythm guitar, vocals
Production
 Jeffrey Norman – mastering

References

10
2006 live albums